James Pantemis  (born February 21, 1997) is a Canadian professional soccer player who plays as a goalkeeper for CF Montréal and the Canadian national team.

Club career

Early career
Pantemis started playing football for AS Pierrefonds at the age of four and later played for Lakeshore SC before joining the Montreal Impact's academy system in 2014.

FC Montreal
In 2016 Pantemis joined FC Montreal, the reserve team of the Montreal Impact in the United Soccer League. He made his professional debut on May 2, 2016, in a 1–0 defeat to Orlando City II, and also featured in a 2–1 defeat to Bethlehem Steel on May 15, 2016. He played two games for FC Montreal after tearing his LCL in June 2016, and was still injured when the club ceased operations after the 2016 season, leaving him unattached for until he signed with the Impact.

Montreal Impact / CF Montréal
After recovering from his LCL injury, Pantemis would train with Serie A club Bologna in September 2017, and would sign a first team contract with Montreal Impact in November 2017. He made his competitive debut for the Impact on July 24, 2019, in a Canadian Championship match against York9 with the Impact winning 1-0.

On March 6, 2020, Pantemis was sent on loan to Canadian Premier League side Valour FC, reuniting with his former Canada U20 coach Rob Gale. He made his debut for Valour on August 16 against Cavalry FC.

After the 2022 MLS season, where Pantemis split starting duties with Sebastian Breza, his option was initially declined by CF Montréal. Pantemis then signed new one-year deal with the club, with an options for 2024 and 2025.

International

Youth
Pantemis was a part of Canada's U-20 program and made his start in a 2–1 victory over England. In May 2018, Pantemis was named to Canada's under-21 squad for the 2018 Toulon Tournament. In February 2020 Pantemis was named to the provisional roster for the Canadian U-23 team ahead of the 2020 CONCACAF Men's Olympic Qualifying Championship. He was named to the final squad on March 10, 2021.

Senior
In June 2017, he was called up to the Canadian senior national team for a friendly against Curaçao, but did not appear. He was subsequently called up for a friendly against Jamaica in September of that year.

In November 2022, Pantemis was named to Canada's squad for the 2022 FIFA World Cup.

Personal life
Pantemis was born in Canada and is of Greek descent. He holds a Greek passport. His grandmother comes from Doliana, a village in Arcadia, Greece.

Career statistics

Club

Honours

Club 
Montreal Impact
 Canadian Championship: 2019, 2021

Notes

References

External links
 
 

1997 births
Living people
Association football goalkeepers
Canadian soccer players
People from Kirkland, Quebec
Soccer people from Quebec
Canadian people of Greek descent
FC Montreal players
CF Montréal players
Valour FC players
USL Championship players
Canadian Premier League players
Canada men's youth international soccer players
Homegrown Players (MLS)
Major League Soccer players
Lakeshore SC players
Pierrefonds FC players
2022 FIFA World Cup players